3 Supermen a Tokyo is a 1968 film directed by Bitto Albertini.

Synopsis 
Two ruthless thieves known as "the supermen" are captured by the government, and in exchange for commuting their sentence they are forced to accompany the agent Martin, who has a mission to find a recording which, if brought to light, would cause a political scandal. But the road is not easy, and they encounter all kinds of obstacles.

Production
3 Supermen a Tokio did not have any of the original cast  outside Gloria Paul of the original film The Three Fantastic Supermen.

3 Supermen a Tokio was shot in Tokyo. When shooting there, director Bitto Albertini stated that filming was shot with indifference from the Japanese passers-by when shooting a car chase with the scene being shot with hidden cameras in hopes to capture the shocked reactions from the crowd.

Release
3 Superman a Tokyo was released in Italy in 1968. It was released in Germany as Drei tolle Kerle on 17 July 1968.

See also 
Supermen Against the Orient
List of Italian films of 1968

References

Notes

Footnotes

Sources

External links
 

1968 films
1960s superhero films
Italian superhero films
Italian comedy films
West German films
German comedy films
Films shot in Tokyo
Superhero comedy films
1968 comedy films
1960s Italian films
1960s German films